A list of American films released in 1950.

Fred Astaire hosted the 23rd Academy Awards ceremony on March 29, 1951, held at the RKO Pantages Theatre in Hollywood. The winner of the Best Motion Picture category was Twentieth Century-Fox's All About Eve.

The other four nominated pictures were Born Yesterday, Father of the Bride, King Solomon's Mines and Sunset Boulevard.

All About Eve was nominated for 14 Oscars, beating the previous record of Gone with the Wind (13).

Newcomer Judy Holliday won the Oscar for Best Actress for her portrayal of showgirl mistress Billie Dawn in the film version of the play Born Yesterday, a role which she had originated on Broadway. Other Best Actress nominees for that year were Bette Davis and Anne Baxter for All About Eve, Eleanor Parker for Caged and Gloria Swanson for Sunset Boulevard.

José Ferrer won the Oscar for Best Actor for his role as the title character in the film version of the 1946 Broadway play, Cyrano de Bergerac, a role which he had played on Broadway. Other nominees that year were Louis Calhern for The Magnificent Yankee, William Holden for Sunset Boulevard, James Stewart for Harvey and Spencer Tracy for Father of the Bride.

The 8th Golden Globe Awards also honored the best films of 1950. That year's Golden Globes also marked the first time that the Best Actor and Actress categories were split into Musical or Comedy or Drama. However, Best Picture remained a single category until the 9th Golden Globe Awards, when it too was split into two categories. Ferrer won the Golden Globe for Best Actor – Motion Picture – Drama, for Cyrano de Bergerac, while Fred Astaire won Best Actor – Motion Picture – Musical or Comedy for Three Little Words. Swanson won Best Actress – Motion Picture – Drama for Sunset Boulevard, while Holliday won for Best Actress – Motion Picture – Musical or Comedy for Born Yesterday. Sunset Boulevard won the Golden Globe for Best Motion Picture.

1950 also saw the film debut of several future stars, such as Marlon Brando, Charlton Heston, Sidney Poitier, Piper Laurie and Debbie Reynolds.

A

B

C

D

E

F

G

H

I

J

K

L

M

N

O

P–Q

R

S

T

U–V

W–Z

Documentaries

Serials

Shorts

See also
 1950 in the United States

References

External links

1950 films at the Internet Movie Database

1950
Films
Lists of 1950 films by country or language